Return to River Cottage is the second series of the Channel 4 programme that follows Hugh Fearnley-Whittingstall during his second year of living in the country at River Cottage, Dorset after leaving the city behind. The preceding series was Escape to River Cottage.

Show summary
In this series, Fearnley-Whittingstall turns his smallholding into a real home farm and edges a little closer to self-sufficiency. He also explores some of the local traditions and continues to meet the residents of Dorset.

List of episodes

References

External links

Channel 4 original programming
2000 British television series debuts
2000 British television series endings
British cooking television shows
English-language television shows